This article lists the election results of Change UK in UK parliamentary elections and in elections to the European Parliament.

2019 European elections 

Change UK stood in the 2019 European Parliament elections in every regional constituency except Northern Ireland as a member of the EPP but failed to win a single seat. Candidates included high-profile celebrities like Robin Bextor, the father of singer Sophie Ellis-Bextor, incumbent Conservative MEP Richard Ashworth, writer Rachel Johnson (sister of Conservative MPs Jo and Boris Johnson); former BBC journalist Gavin Esler; former Conservative MPs Stephen Dorrell and Neil Carmichael; former Labour MEP Carole Tongue; former Labour MPs Roger Casale and Jon Owen Jones; former Liberal Democrat MEP Diana Wallis; and the former deputy Prime Minister of Poland, Jacek Rostowski.

2019 general election 

Change UK was part of the Unite to Remain electoral pact in the snap 2019 general election. The party only stood in three constituencies, and all three candidates were incumbent Members of Parliament: Anna Soubry, Mike Gapes and Chris Leslie.

The only constituencies with Change UK candidates were Broxtowe, Ilford South and Nottingham East. Ann Coffey and Joan Ryan did not stand for re-election. The Liberal Democrats announced that they would not stand against Anna Soubry in Broxtowe. Only Leslie lost his deposit.

In the election on 12 December 2019, all three of the party's candidates lost their seats: Soubry and Gapes came third in their seats, while Leslie was fourth. Soubry had the highest vote share at 8.5%. Of its six former members, Heidi Allen did not stand in the election, Gavin Shuker stood as an independent candidate and the other four stood for the Liberal Democrats. All lost their seats, with Luciana Berger performing best, coming second with 31.9%, standing in a different constituency, Finchley and Golders Green in North London.

References 

Brexit
Election results by party in the United Kingdom
2019 in British politics